Strömma is a locality situated in Värmdö Municipality, Stockholm County, Sweden with 579 inhabitants in 2010.

See also 
 Strömma Canal

References 

Populated places in Värmdö Municipality